The Tegucigalpa Honduras Temple is the 141st temple of the Church of Jesus Christ of Latter-day Saints (LDS Church). It is the first to be built in Honduras and the sixth in Central America. The Tegucigalpa Honduras Temple serves Latter-day Saints in Honduras and Nicaragua. There are 168,000 Latter-day Saints in Honduras and Nicaragua in 302 congregations.

History
The temple was announced in a letter to local church leaders 9 June 2006; and later in a press release published 24 June 2006. Ceremonial groundbreaking and dedication were held at a site located in eastern Tegucigalpa, near the Basilica de Suyapa, on 9 June 2007, but the church later announced that the temple would be built at a new site.

On 28 January 2009, the LDS Church announced that due to objections from the local government, the proposed temple would no longer be located at the previously designated site. The primary reason for the relocation was due to a belief, widely held by members of the Tegucigalpa city council, that the temple would overshadow the local basilica. The church had all the primary permits secured, but out of respect for the strong feelings of those involved, the church decided to seek a new location. The temple was to be built adjacent to an LDS Church Institute of Religion. Excavation had begun before the church ceded to pressure to relocate the building. Church officials decided to move the temple in order to avoid confrontation.

The plans to build a temple in Tegucigalpa were announced by the LDS Church to local church leaders on June 9, 2006. The original groundbreaking and site dedication was on 9 June 2007, by Spencer V. Jones, a member of the church's Second Quorum of the Seventy and president of the church's Central America Area.

On December 11, 2012, the church announced an open house from February 9 through March 2, 2013. The temple was dedicated on March 17, 2013 by Dieter F. Uchtdorf of the church's First Presidency.

In 2020, the Tegucigalpa Honduras Temple was closed temporarily during the year in response to the coronavirus pandemic, but is now operational again.

See also

 Comparison of temples of The Church of Jesus Christ of Latter-day Saints
 List of temples of The Church of Jesus Christ of Latter-day Saints
 List of temples of The Church of Jesus Christ of Latter-day Saints by geographic region
 Temple architecture (Latter-day Saints)
 The Church of Jesus Christ of Latter-day Saints in Honduras

References

External links
Tegucigalpa Honduras Temple Official site
Tegucigalpa Honduras Temple at ChurchofJesusChristTemples.org

Religious buildings and structures completed in 2013
21st-century Latter Day Saint temples
Religious buildings and structures in Honduras
Buildings and structures in Tegucigalpa
Temples (LDS Church) in Latin America
Temples (LDS Church) in North America
The Church of Jesus Christ of Latter-day Saints in Honduras
2013 establishments in Honduras
2013 in Christianity